Jasna Šekarić (born 17 December 1965) is a Serbian sport shooter, considered as one of the most successful female shooters in ISSF history. She has won a total of five Olympic medals: one gold, three silvers and one bronze.  She has also won three World Championship gold medals in the 10 m air pistol, in addition to five European Championship gold medals she won in the 10 m air pistol and 25 m pistol. In 1992, she lost the Olympic gold medal to Marina Logvinenko despite having the same score. She is one of only six shooters (by 2012) to compete in at least seven Olympic Games.

Personal life 
She was born in Belgrade, SR Serbia, SFR Yugoslavia and grew up in Osijek, SR Croatia, then part of Yugoslavia, where she began to practice shooting. In the school competitions, she first competed with a rifle and achieved a decent place at the regional championships. She later began to use a pistol. In 1990 she moved to Belgrade, where she had a successful year in sports at a private level. She is divorced and has two children, Lea (Леа) and Luka (Лука).

Career 
She was named several times was the best sportswoman and shooter in the SFR Yugoslavia, Croatia, FR Yugoslavia, Serbia and Montenegro and Serbia. In 1988 and 1994 she received a Golden Badge of the Sport award for Yugoslavia's best athlete.
In the 2008 games, she was the country's flag bearer at the opening ceremonies. Jasna is listed in the golden book of sport shooting as the only shooter participating at five Olympic Games while being a finalist in all five.

Despite having never changed nationality, Šekarić has competed under four flags at her six Olympics. She competed for Yugoslavia at the 1988 Olympics. In 1992, since Yugoslavia was under UN sanctions, she (and fifty other Serbians, Montenegrins, and Macedonians) competed as Independent Olympic Participants. Her next two Olympics were under the flag of the Federal Republic of Yugoslavia (the red star was removed from SFRY's flag). In 2004 she competed representing Serbia and Montenegro, which had the same flag as FR Yugoslavia, and she finally competed for Serbia in 2008. Another athlete to compete under four different flags is Serbian-American table tennis player Ilija Lupulesku, but he changed nationality in the process.

Olympic results

See also
 List of athletes with the most appearances at Olympic Games
 List of flag bearers for Serbia at the Olympics
 2008 Summer Olympics national flag bearers

References

External links
 
 
 

1965 births
Living people
Sportspeople from Belgrade
Sportspeople from Osijek
Yugoslav female sport shooters
Serbian female sport shooters
Serbs of Croatia
ISSF pistol shooters
Olympic shooters of Yugoslavia
Olympic shooters as Independent Olympic Participants
Olympic shooters of Serbia and Montenegro
Olympic shooters of Serbia
Shooters at the 1988 Summer Olympics
Shooters at the 1992 Summer Olympics
Shooters at the 1996 Summer Olympics
Shooters at the 2000 Summer Olympics
Shooters at the 2004 Summer Olympics
Shooters at the 2008 Summer Olympics
Shooters at the 2012 Summer Olympics
Olympic gold medalists for Yugoslavia
Olympic bronze medalists for Yugoslavia
Olympic silver medalists as Independent Olympic Participants

Olympic silver medalists for Serbia and Montenegro
Olympic medalists in shooting
World record holders in shooting
European champions for Yugoslavia
European champions for Serbia and Montenegro
European Games competitors for Serbia
Medalists at the 2004 Summer Olympics
Medalists at the 2000 Summer Olympics
Medalists at the 1992 Summer Olympics
Medalists at the 1988 Summer Olympics

Mediterranean Games gold medalists for Yugoslavia
Mediterranean Games silver medalists for Serbia
Mediterranean Games bronze medalists for Serbia
Competitors at the 1991 Mediterranean Games
Competitors at the 1997 Mediterranean Games
Competitors at the 2005 Mediterranean Games
Competitors at the 2009 Mediterranean Games
Competitors at the 2013 Mediterranean Games
Mediterranean Games gold medalists for Serbia
Mediterranean Games bronze medalists for Yugoslavia
Mediterranean Games medalists in shooting
Shooters at the 2015 European Games